Revolution Bars Group, previously known as Inventive Leisure and The New Inventive Bar Company, is a city centre bar chain with headquarters in Ashton-under-Lyne, Greater Manchester, England. The bar brands trade under the names Revolution and Revolución de Cuba.

Background
It was founded by Roy Ellis and Neil Macleod, who had met in London in the 1980s. They opened their first bar in Ashton-under-Lyne in 1991, with nightclubs and a music venue following soon after. In 1996 they moved away from the previously unbranded bars and clubs to start the Revolution chain, with vodka being featured as the principal product. 
In 2000, the company floated on the Alternative Investment Market, by this point having 21 bars. It was bought out in 2006 by Alchemy Partners amid competition from Regent Inns and Ultimate Leisure. The deal valued the company at £42.5m.
The company was ranked 25th in the 2013 The Sunday Times 100 Best Companies to Work For list, and employs about 1,800 people. Its turnover in the year ending June 2008 was expected to be £71m with profits of £11m. In 2013, Phill Danks became CEO of Revolution Bars Group.

In August 2017, Revolution Bars Group rejected a merger proposal from nightclub operator Deltic Group, saying Deltic's offer was "not in the best interests of shareholders at this time". In response, Deltic Group said it wanted to appeal directly to shareholders, proposing that existing Revolution shareholders would own 65% of the new company, while Deltic would own the remaining 35%. Revolution Bars Group said it instead preferred a £101.5m takeover offer by Slug and Lettuce owner Stonegate.

Brands

Revolution
Revolution is the original brand of Revolution Bars Group. The unique selling point is the focus on vodka.

Revolución de Cuba
Revolución de Cuba was created in 2011. The focus is on rum and Cuba.

References

External links
Revolution
Revolución de Cuba

Pub chains